The 1978 Winter Universiade, the IX Winter Universiade, took place in Špindlerův Mlýn, Czechoslovakia.

Medal table

1978
U
U
Winter Universiade
Multi-sport events in Czechoslovakia
Sport in Hradec Králové Region
Winter Universiade
Winter sports competitions in Czechoslovakia